Twit may refer to:

 TWiT.tv, a podcast network
 This Week in Tech, a podcast on the TWiT.tv network
 The Twits, a children's book by Roald Dahl
 Twit (song), a 2019 song by Hwasa
 William "Twit" Scuttle, a fictional character; in the List of The Deptford Mice characters

See also

 Upper Class Twit of the Year, a comedy sketch by Monty Python
 
 Twitter
 Tweet (disambiguation)